The Lanczos algorithm is an iterative method devised by Cornelius Lanczos that is an adaptation of power methods to find the  "most useful" (tending towards extreme highest/lowest) eigenvalues and eigenvectors of an  Hermitian matrix, where  is often but not necessarily much smaller than . Although computationally efficient in principle, the method as initially formulated was not useful, due to its numerical instability.

In 1970, Ojalvo and Newman showed how to make the method numerically stable and applied it to the solution of very large engineering structures subjected to dynamic loading. This was achieved using a method for purifying the Lanczos vectors (i.e. by repeatedly reorthogonalizing each newly generated vector with all previously generated ones) to any degree of accuracy, which when not performed, produced a series of vectors that were highly contaminated by those associated with the lowest natural frequencies.

In their original work, these authors also suggested how to select a starting vector (i.e. use a random-number generator to select each element of the starting vector) and suggested an empirically determined method for determining , the reduced number of vectors (i.e. it should be selected to be approximately 1.5 times the number of accurate eigenvalues desired). Soon thereafter their work was followed by Paige, who also provided an error analysis. In 1988, Ojalvo produced a more detailed history of this algorithm and an efficient eigenvalue error test.

The algorithm
Input a Hermitian matrix  of size , and optionally a number of iterations  (as default, let ).
 Strictly speaking, the algorithm does not need access to the explicit matrix, but only a function  that computes the product of the matrix by an arbitrary vector. This function is called at most  times.
Output an  matrix  with orthonormal columns and a tridiagonal real symmetric matrix  of size .
Warning The Lanczos iteration is prone to numerical instability. When executed in non-exact arithmetic, additional measures (as outlined in later sections) should be taken to ensure validity of the results.
 Let  be an arbitrary vector with Euclidean norm .
 Abbreviated initial iteration step:
 Let .
 Let .
 Let .
 For  do:
 Let  (also Euclidean norm).
 If , then let ,
 Let .
 Let .
 Let .
 Let  be the matrix with columns . Let .

There are in principle four ways to write the iteration procedure. Paige and other works show that the above order of operations is the most numerically stable.

Not counting the matrix–vector multiplication, each iteration does  arithmetical operations. The matrix–vector multiplication can be done in  arithmetical operations where  is the average number of nonzero elements in a row. The total complexity is thus , or  if ; the Lanczos algorithm can be very fast for sparse matrices. Schemes for improving numerical stability are typically judged against this high performance.

The vectors  are called Lanczos vectors. 
The vector  is not used after  is computed, and the vector  is not used after  is computed. Hence one may use the same storage for all three. Likewise, if only the tridiagonal matrix  is sought, then the raw iteration does not need  after having computed , although some schemes for improving the numerical stability would need it later on. Sometimes the subsequent Lanczos vectors are recomputed from  when needed.

Application to the eigenproblem 
The Lanczos algorithm is most often brought up in the context of finding the eigenvalues and eigenvectors of a matrix, but whereas an ordinary diagonalization of a matrix would make eigenvectors and eigenvalues apparent from inspection, the same is not true for the tridiagonalization performed by the Lanczos algorithm; nontrivial additional steps are needed to compute even a single eigenvalue or eigenvector. Nonetheless, applying the Lanczos algorithm is often a significant step forward in computing the eigendecomposition.
 For tridiagonal matrices, there exist a number of specialised algorithms, often with better computational complexity than general-purpose algorithms. For example, if  is an  tridiagonal symmetric matrix then:
 The continuant recursion allows computing the characteristic polynomial in  operations, and evaluating it at a point in  operations.
 The Fast Multipole Method can compute all eigenvalues in just  operations.
 Some general eigendecomposition algorithms, notably the QR algorithm, are known to converge faster for tridiagonal matrices than for general matrices. Asymptotic complexity of tridiagonal QR is  just as for the divide-and-conquer algorithm (though the constant factor may be different); since the eigenvectors together have  elements, this is asymptotically optimal.
 Even algorithms whose convergence rates are unaffected by unitary transformations, such as the power method and inverse iteration, may enjoy low-level performance benefits from being applied to the tridiagonal matrix  rather than the original matrix . Since  is very sparse with all nonzero elements in highly predictable positions, it permits compact storage with excellent performance vis-à-vis caching.
The combination of good performance for sparse matrices and the ability to compute several (without computing all) eigenvalues are the main reasons for choosing to use the Lanczos algorithm.

Application to tridiagonalization 
Though the eigenproblem is often the motivation for applying the Lanczos algorithm, the operation the algorithm primarily performs is tridiagonalization of a matrix, for which numerically stable Householder transformations have been favoured since the 1950s.  During the 1960s the Lanczos algorithm was disregarded. Interest in it was rejuvenated by the Kaniel–Paige convergence theory and the development of methods to prevent numerical instability, but the Lanczos algorithm remains the alternative algorithm that one tries only if Householder is not satisfactory.

Aspects in which the two algorithms differ include:
 Lanczos takes advantage of  being a sparse matrix, whereas Householder does not, and will generate fill-in.
 Lanczos works throughout with the original matrix  (and has no problem with it being known only implicitly), whereas raw Householder wants to modify the matrix during the computation (although that can be avoided).
Each factor is however determined by a single vector, so the storage requirements are the same for both algorithms, and  can be computed in  time.
 Householder is numerically stable, whereas raw Lanczos is not.
Householder is less parallel, having a sequence of  scalar quantities computed that each depend on the previous quantity in the sequence.

Derivation of the algorithm
There are several lines of reasoning which lead to the Lanczos algorithm.

A more provident power method

The power method for finding the eigenvalue of largest magnitude and a corresponding eigenvector of a matrix  is roughly
 Pick a random vector .
 For  (until the direction of  has converged) do:
 Let 
 Let 
 In the large  limit,  approaches the normed eigenvector corresponding to the largest magnitude eigenvalue.
A critique that can be raised against this method is that it is wasteful: it spends a lot of work (the matrix–vector products in step 2.1) extracting information from the matrix , but pays attention only to the very last result; implementations typically use the same variable for all the vectors , having each new iteration overwrite the results from the previous one. It may be desirable to instead keeptl all the intermediate results and organise the data.

One piece of information that trivially is available from the vectors  is a chain of Krylov subspaces. One way of stating that without introducing sets into the algorithm is to claim that it computes

a subset  of a basis of  such that  for every  and all 

To avoid that, one can combine the power iteration with a Gram–Schmidt process, to instead produce an orthonormal basis of these Krylov subspaces. 
 Pick a random vector  of Euclidean norm . Let .
 For  do:
 Let .
 For all  let .
 Let .
The relation between the power iteration vectors  and the orthogonal vectors  is that
 .
Thus the same basis for the chain of Krylov subspaces is computed by
 Pick a random vector  of Euclidean norm .
 For  do:
 Let .
 For all  let .
 Let .
 Let .
 If  then let ,
A priori the coefficients  satisfy
  for all ;
the definition  may seem a bit odd, but fits the general pattern  since 

Because the power iteration vectors  that were eliminated from this recursion satisfy  the vectors  and coefficients  contain enough information from  that all of  can be computed, so nothing was lost by switching vectors. (Indeed, it turns out that the data collected here give significantly better approximations of the largest eigenvalue than one gets from an equal number of iterations in the power method, although that is not necessarily obvious at this point.)

This last procedure is the Arnoldi iteration. The Lanczos algorithm then arises as the simplification one gets from eliminating calculation steps that turn out to be trivial when  is Hermitian—in particular most of the  coefficients turn out to be zero.

Elementarily, if  is Hermitian then 

For  we know that , and since  by construction is orthogonal to this subspace, this inner product must be zero. (This is essentially also the reason why sequences of orthogonal polynomials can always be given a three-term recurrence relation.) For  one gets 

 

since the latter is real on account of being the norm of a vector. For  one gets 

meaning this is real too.

Since 

 

the matrix  is Hermitian. This implies that  is also lower Hessenberg, so it must in fact be tridiagional. Being Hermitian, its main diagonal is real, and since its first subdiagonal is real by construction, the same is true for its first superdiagonal. Therefore,  is a real, symmetric matrix—the matrix  of the Lanczos algorithm specification.

Simultaneous approximation of extreme eigenvalues
One way of characterising the eigenvectors of a Hermitian matrix  is as stationary points of the Rayleigh quotient

 

Repeating that for an increasing chain  produces two sequences of vectors:  and  such that  and

The question then arises how to choose the subspaces so that these sequences converge at optimal rate.

In general

 

In other words, we can start with some arbitrary initial vector  construct the vector spaces

and then seek  such that 

Thus we are again led to the problem of iteratively computing such a basis for the sequence of Krylov subspaces.

Convergence and other dynamics
To fix notation, let  be the eigenvalues (these are known to all be real, and thus possible to order) and let  be an orthonormal set of eigenvectors such that  for all .

It is also convenient to fix a notation for the coefficients of the initial Lanczos vector  with respect to this eigenbasis; let  for all , so that . A starting vector  depleted of some eigencomponent will delay convergence to the corresponding eigenvalue, and even though this just comes out as a constant factor in the error bounds, depletion remains undesirable. One common technique for avoiding being consistently hit by it is to pick  by first drawing the elements randomly according to the same normal distribution with mean  and then rescale the vector to norm . This makes it possible to bound the probability that for example .

Kaniel–Paige convergence theory
The convergence for the Lanczos algorithm is often orders of magnitude faster than that for the power iteration algorithm.

The bounds for  come from the above interpretation of eigenvalues as extreme values of the Rayleigh quotient .

The dimension  Krylov subspace is 

 

In this parametrisation of the Krylov subspace, we have

 

and more generally 

 

for any polynomial .

Thus

A key difference between numerator and denominator here is that the  term vanishes in the numerator, but not in the denominator. Thus if one can pick  to be large at  but small at all other eigenvalues, one will get a tight bound on the error .

Since  has many more eigenvalues than  has coefficients, this may seem a tall order, but one way to meet it is to use Chebyshev polynomials. Writing  for the degree  Chebyshev polynomial of the first kind (that which satisfies  for all ), we have a polynomial which stays in the range  on the known interval  but grows rapidly outside it. With some scaling of the argument, we can have it map all eigenvalues except  into . Let

 

Furthermore

the quantity 

 

(i.e., the ratio of the first eigengap to the diameter of the rest of the spectrum) is thus of key importance for the convergence rate here. Also writing 

we may conclude that

 

Under that constraint, the case that most favours the power method is that , so consider that. Late in the power method, the iteration vector:

 

where each new iteration effectively multiplies the -amplitude  by

The estimate of the largest eigenvalue is then 

so the above bound for the Lanczos algorithm convergence rate should be compared to 

In the  region, the latter is more like , and performs like the power method would with an eigengap twice as large; a notable improvement.

Numerical stability
Stability means how much the algorithm will be affected (i.e. will it produce the approximate result close to the original one) if there are small numerical errors introduced and accumulated. Numerical stability is the central criterion for judging the usefulness of implementing an algorithm on a computer with roundoff.

For the Lanczos algorithm, it can be proved that with exact arithmetic, the set of vectors  constructs an orthonormal basis, and the eigenvalues/vectors solved are good approximations to those of the original matrix. However, in practice (as the calculations are performed in floating point arithmetic where inaccuracy is inevitable), the orthogonality is quickly lost and in some cases the new vector could even be linearly dependent on the set that is already constructed. As a result, some of the eigenvalues of the resultant tridiagonal matrix may not be approximations to the original matrix. Therefore, the Lanczos algorithm is not very stable.

Users of this algorithm must be able to find and remove those "spurious" eigenvalues. Practical implementations of the Lanczos algorithm go in three directions to fight this stability issue:

 Prevent the loss of orthogonality,
 Recover the orthogonality after the basis is generated.
 After the good and "spurious" eigenvalues are all identified, remove the spurious ones.

Variations
Variations on the Lanczos algorithm exist where the vectors involved are tall, narrow matrices instead of vectors and the normalizing constants are small square matrices. These are called "block" Lanczos algorithms and can be much faster on computers with large numbers of registers and long memory-fetch times.

Many implementations of the Lanczos algorithm restart after a certain number of iterations.  One of the most influential restarted variations is the implicitly restarted Lanczos method, which is implemented in ARPACK.  This has led into a number of other restarted variations such as restarted Lanczos bidiagonalization.  Another successful restarted variation is the Thick-Restart Lanczos method, which has been implemented in a software package called TRLan.

Nullspace over a finite field

In 1995, Peter Montgomery published an algorithm, based on the Lanczos algorithm, for finding elements of the nullspace of a large sparse matrix over GF(2); since the set of people interested in large sparse matrices over finite fields and the set of people interested in large eigenvalue problems scarcely overlap, this is often also called the block Lanczos algorithm without causing unreasonable confusion.

Applications
Since weighted-term text retrieval engines implement just this operation, the Lanczos algorithm can be applied efficiently to text documents (see latent semantic indexing). Eigenvectors are also important for large-scale ranking methods such as the HITS algorithm developed by Jon Kleinberg, or the PageRank algorithm used by Google.

Lanczos algorithms are also used in condensed matter physics as a method for solving Hamiltonians of strongly correlated electron systems, as well as in shell model codes in nuclear physics.

Implementations
The NAG Library contains several routines for the solution of large scale linear systems and eigenproblems which use the Lanczos algorithm.

MATLAB and GNU Octave come with ARPACK built-in. Both stored and implicit matrices can be analyzed through the eigs() function (Matlab/Octave).

Similarly, in Python, the SciPy package has scipy.sparse.linalg.eigsh which is also a wrapper for the SSEUPD and DSEUPD functions functions from ARPACK which use the Implicitly Restarted Lanczos Method.

A Matlab implementation of the Lanczos algorithm (note precision issues) is available as a part of the Gaussian Belief Propagation Matlab Package. The GraphLab collaborative filtering library incorporates a large scale parallel implementation of the Lanczos algorithm (in C++) for multicore.

The PRIMME library also implements a Lanczos-like algorithm.

Notes

References

Further reading
 
 
 

Numerical linear algebra